The North Texas State Fair and Rodeo is a fair held in Denton, Texas. This annual fair is compact by state fair standards, yet covers every aspect a local fair would encompass.

The fair brings in over 100,000 people annually during its  9-day run.

The fair also showcases the best of Texas Country music, with nightly free concerts with admission to the fair; 2008's lineup consisted of Stoney Larue, David Ball, Grupo Vida, Mark David Manders, Bleu Edmondson, Johnny Cooper, Randy Rogers Band, Reckless Kelly, and Restless Heart.  Past performers Pat Green, Charlie Robison, Bruce Robison, Cross Canadian Ragweed, Jason Boland, The Great Divide, Radney Foster, The Bellamy Brothers and many others are well known around Texas.

External links

Official website

Fairs in Texas
Festivals in Denton, Texas
Rodeos
Texas, North
Annual events in Texas
August events
Texas culture